David Van Day (born David Paul Day, 28 November 1956) is an English singer, songwriter and politician who was formerly a member of the pop vocal duo Dollar. He was also a member of the 1970s vocal group Guys 'n' Dolls (along with his Dollar partner Thereza Bazar), and two latter-day line-ups of Bucks Fizz in the 1990s and 2000s.

Biography
Van Day was born David Paul Day on 28 November 1956 in Brighton, Sussex, England. Having been a member of song-and-dance troupe The Young Generation, in 1974, he successfully auditioned for the then-new vocal group Guys 'n' Dolls. The group had a few hits, and Van Day began a romantic relationship with bandmate Thereza Bazar. Keen to embark on a solo career, Van Day was sacked from the band along with Bazar shortly afterwards in 1977.

Van Day and Bazar then decided to perform together, and formed a new duo, Dollar. The band recorded and toured from 1978 to 1983, then again from 1986 to 1988. They had several top-ten hits in the UK, including "Love's Gotta Hold on Me" and "Give Me Back My Heart". He also had a brief solo career as a movie actor, appearing as a devious handyman in Michael Armstrong's 1983 horror anthology film Screamtime, opposite Dora Bryan and Jean Anderson. After a final top-ten hit, "O L'amour", in 1988, Dollar broke up for a second time. Bazar left the music industry and moved to Australia.

In the early to mid-1990s, Van Day toured as Dollar with a succession of female singers. In the late 1990s he joined one incarnation of the pop group Bucks Fizz, alongside original Bucks Fizz member Mike Nolan. With both of these acts he recorded and released budget-priced CDs of re-recorded hits. Neither sold well and the Bucks Fizz tracks received widespread criticism from fans.

In 2003 Van Day (with Bazar) competed in the ITV1 reality show Reborn in the USA. He was the first act voted off. He caused controversy during the show, accusing producers of biased editing, and arguing with singer and fellow contestant Sonia, accusing her of "being crafty and cunning to try to save her own skin".

In 2008, Van Day was a semi-finalist on the eighth series of British reality television show I'm a Celebrity...Get Me Out of Here!, finishing in fourth place. 

Van Day hosted the eleven-part reality series Brides on a Bus on Wedding TV. He also briefly appeared in the series Celebrity Coach Trip on Channel 4, and was interviewed with wife Sue Moxley on The Jeremy Kyle Show.

Politics
In 2007, Van Day stood as a Conservative Party candidate for Brighton and Hove City Council in the East Brighton ward, but neither he nor the other two Conservative candidates was successful in gaining a seat. 

In 2018, Van Day stood for a seat on Thurrock council in Aveley and Uplands Ward as a Conservative. The election was won by MEP Tim Aker. In 2019, Aker resigned and Van Day won the subsequent by-election. He lost the seat to Labour by 20 votes in May 2022.

Personal life
In the 1990s Van Day married a model called Maria. They have two children together, Amber Van Day and Olivia Van Day. He started a relationship with the beauty editor of The Sun newspaper, Sue Moxley, but initially ended it on the Channel 5 TV show The Wright Stuff, They reunited soon after and married in Orsett, Essex, on 21 February 2010.  They are currently living together in South Ockendon, Essex.

During the early 2000s Van Day operated a burger van with his best friend Les Cole in Brighton, earning him the nickname "Burger Van Day"

In late October 2016, Van Day suffered a heart attack.  He was taken to a hospital in Essex, England, where a stent was fitted.

Solo discography
 1983 – "Young Americans Talking" (UK No. 43)
 1985 – "Ringing the Bell"
 1989 – "She Said, She Said"
 2000 – "A Fistful of Dollar"
 2008 – "Biff Baff Boff" (with Timmy Mallett as “Croc Idol”)
 2009 – "A Big Ship on the Mersey"

References

External links
 Dollar – Shooting Stars Website
 
 
 

1956 births
Living people
English male singers
People from Brighton
Alumni of the Italia Conti Academy of Theatre Arts
Councillors in Essex
Conservative Party (UK) councillors
I'm a Celebrity...Get Me Out of Here! (British TV series) participants